Stirling City Choir was formed in 1951 as Stirling Choral Union. It is a large mixed voice choir based in Stirling, Scotland, which has performed a variety of mainstream choral works as well as original compositions by members of the choir.

History

On 12 September 1951, Derrick Cantrell addressed a meeting of singers in the Fellowship Hall, Craigs, Stirling. He said that "A number of singers had been tested and there was a potential membership of over eighty." A draft constitution was adopted and the first chairman was appointed: Col. John Logan.

The first concert was a performance of ‘Messiah’ on 26 December 1951, with Derrick Cantrell conducting an orchestra of 18 players from Glasgow and a choir of "100 voices". Soloists were Joan Packer, Ruth Morrison, Duncan Robertson and Frederic Westcott.

By 1954 under the baton of Roy Lennox, the choir had become established in the life of Stirling and has remained so over the years, conducted by Bramwell Cook, Henry Havergal, Stuart Anderson, George Farmer, Richard Halliday, once again George Farmer, Richard Galloway, and currently, Eric Dunlea. A policy of engaging young soloists has been encouraged including Patricia McMahon, Kathleen Livingstone, Neil Mackie and Margaret Anne Marshall all of whom are enjoying successful careers in the music world. The welcome close liaison with professional orchestral players in Central Scotland has always ensured a first class orchestra for the Spring Concerts.

In the year 2002, after celebrating the 50th Anniversary of Stirling and District Choral Union with a performance of the Scottish Premiere of ‘Christus’ by Franz Liszt with Falkirk Festival Chorus, it was decided that the choir should modernise and become Stirling City Choir in keeping with the new city status of Stirling.

People 

Stirling City Choir is currently being led by Musical Director Gillian Craig, and rehearsals are accompanied by Seb Thirlway.

Previous concerts 
Stirling City Choir perform a number of concerts each season, normally at Christmas, a charity concert in February and the main concert in spring.

The Choir were fortunate to have the opportunity to join a mass choir from across Scotland and perform Karl Jenkins' The Armed Man on 11 September 2005 at the Glasgow Royal Concert Hall with the BBC Scottish Symphonic Orchestra, conducted by Karl Jenkins. The choir were invited back again on 12 November 2006, this time to perform the requiem.

The table below lists all the choir's previous spring concert performances:

External links
Stirling City Choir official homepage

Scottish choirs
1951 establishments in Scotland
Musical groups established in 1951